Richard G. Groves (born 1909/1910) was an English professional football player and manager. He was also active in cricket and rugby.

Playing career
Groves played an inside forward, for Bristol Rovers, Southampton, Plymouth Argyle and Torquay United.

Coaching career
Groves coached Irish club Sligo Rovers in 1951, and  Dutch team ADO Den Haag in 1953. Whilst in the Netherlands he worked with the Royal Dutch Football Association for two years.

Groves also worked on the ground staff for Somerset County Cricket Club.

He emigrated to Australia in 1954, working for the National Fitness Council in Toowoomba. In May 1954 he became coach of North Shore in Sydney.

He also coached the Toowoomba Clydesdales rugby league team. He became coach of Hakoah Sydney for the 1960 season.

References

Year of death missing
English footballers
Bristol Rovers F.C. players
Southampton F.C. players
Plymouth Argyle F.C. players
Torquay United F.C. players
Association football inside forwards
English football managers
Sligo Rovers F.C. managers
ADO Den Haag managers
Hakoah Sydney City East FC managers
League of Ireland managers
English expatriate football managers
English expatriates in Ireland
Expatriate football managers in the Republic of Ireland
English expatriates in the Netherlands
Expatriate football managers in the Netherlands
English expatriates in Australia
Expatriate soccer managers in Australia
Year of birth uncertain